Rund Kanika (born 15 July 1963) is a boxer from Zaire, who competed in the light-heavyweight (– 81 kg) division at the 1988 Summer Olympics. Danika lost his opening bout to Osmond Imadiyi of Nigeria. Kanika won the gold medal in the light-heavyweight division at the 1987 All-Africa Games, defeating Mustapha Moussa of Algeria in the final.

References

External links
 

1963 births
Living people
Light-heavyweight boxers
Olympic boxers of the Democratic Republic of the Congo
Boxers at the 1988 Summer Olympics
African Games gold medalists for DR Congo
African Games medalists in boxing
Democratic Republic of the Congo male boxers
Competitors at the 1987 All-Africa Games
Sportspeople from Kinshasa